Palestine High School is a public high school located in Palestine, Texas (United States) and classified as a 5A school by the UIL. It is part of the Palestine Independent School District located in central Anderson County. The old Palestine High School built in 1915 is now The Museum for East Texas Culture. In 2015, the school was rated "Met Standard" by the Texas Education Agency.

Athletics
The Palestine Wildcats compete in the following sports 

Baseball
Basketball
Cross Country
Football
Golf
Powerlifting
Soccer
Softball
Tennis
Track and Field
Volleyball

State Titles
Palestine (UIL)

Football - 
1964 (3A)
Boys Golf - 
2005 (3A), 2006 (3A)
Boys 4A Soccer 2016 state champ
- 

Palestine Green Bay (PVIL) 

Boys Basketball - 
1954 (PVIL-A), 1955 (PVIL-A)

Notable alumni
Bill Bradley, (b. 1947) is a former NFL Player and coach.
Guy Brown, (b. 1955) is a former NFL linebacker for the Dallas Cowboys. 
Ivory Lee Brown, (b. 1969) is a former NFL running back for Arizona Cardinals
Russ Cotton, (1915–2009) was an NFL quarterback for the Pittsburgh Steelers
Adrian Peterson, NFL running back, currently a free agent.
James Saxton, (1940–2014) was an All-American NFL halfback for the Dallas Texans  
Todd Staples, (b. 1963) is the former two-term Texas Commissioner of Agriculture.
Rachel Dean , is an Australian clothing designer and manufacturer.

References

External links
 Palestine ISD

Schools in Anderson County, Texas
Public high schools in Texas
1915 establishments in Texas